Tin Shui may refer to:
 Tin Shui Estate, a public housing estate in Tin Shui Wai, Hong Kong
 Tin Shui stop, an MTR Light Rail stop adjacent to the estate